Ocucaje District is one of fourteen districts of the province Ica in Peru.

References

 

1984 establishments in Peru